Michigan's 1st congressional district is a United States congressional district fully contains the 15 counties of the Upper Peninsula of Michigan and 20 counties of Northern Michigan in the Lower Peninsula. The district is currently represented by Republican Jack Bergman.

Geography
The district is the second-largest congressional district east of the Mississippi River by land area, only behind Maine's 2nd congressional district. Its boundaries contain the entire Upper Peninsula of Michigan and much of the northern part of the Lower Peninsula. Altogether, the district makes up about 44% of the land area of the state of Michigan yet contains only 7% of Michigan's population. It contains the second-longest shoreline of any district in the United States, behind Alaska's at-large congressional district.

Counties
Of the 83 counties in Michigan, the following 35 lie entirely within the district. One county (Wexford) lies partially in the district.

History

Prior to 1992, the 1st congressional district was a Detroit-based congressional district. From the election of Republican John B. Sosnowski in 1925 until 1964, the former 1st district was represented by only one non-Polish-American politician, Robert H. Clancy. Along with Sosnowski, 6 Polish-Americans served as the 1st district's representatives elected 7 times, since 1925. The other strong Polish Michigan congressional districts were the 15th district (where half of the elected were Polish-American) and the dissolved 16th district (where all three elected representatives were of Polish descent). In 1964, the 1st congressional district was drawn as a new, African-American majority district reflecting the changing demographics of Detroit, while enough of the old 1st district was moved to the 14th district so that the 14th district retained the 1st's old congressman.  John Conyers was elected to congress from the 1st district, a position he would hold until the 1st was removed from Detroit.

After 1992, the 1st district covered land in the UP and Northern Michigan. Most of this territory had been known as the 11th district from 1892 to 1992. The 1st from 1992 to 2002 was similar to the present district, except that it did not extend nearly as far south along Lake Michigan, while it took in Traverse City and some surrounding areas on the west side of the state.

Voting

Major settlements in the district

Alpena
Boyne City
Calumet
Charlevoix
Cheboygan
East Tawas
Escanaba
Gaylord
Grayling
Hancock
Harbor Springs
Houghton
Houghton Lake
Iron Mountain
Ironwood
Ishpeming
Kalkaska
Kingsford
Lake City
Manistique
Marquette (largest settlement)
Menominee
Negaunee
Petoskey
Roscommon
Sault Ste. Marie
Standish
Tawas City
Traverse City
West Branch

List of members representing the district

Elections

2012

2014

2016

2018

2020

2022

See also

Michigan's congressional districts
List of United States congressional districts
Superior (proposed state)

Notes

References
 Govtrack.us for the 1st District - Lists current Senators and representative, and map showing district outline
 The Political graveyard: U.S. Representatives from Michigan, 1807–2003
U.S. Representatives 1837–2003, Michigan Manual 2003–2004

 Congressional Biographical Directory of the United States 1774–present

External links
Rep. Jack Bergman's official House of Representatives website

01
Upper Peninsula of Michigan
Northern Michigan
Constituencies established in 1843
1843 establishments in Michigan